The 1996 European Figure Skating Championships was a senior-level international competition held in Sofia, Bulgaria. Elite skaters from European ISU member nations competed in the disciplines of men's singles, ladies' singles, pair skating, and ice dancing.

Results

Men

Ladies

Pairs

Ice dancing

References

External links
 1996 European Figure Skating Championships

European Figure Skating Championships, 1996
European Figure Skating Championships
International figure skating competitions hosted by Bulgaria
European Figure Skating Championships
Sports competitions in Sofia
1990s in Sofia